Pedro Okuda (born  in Marilia, Brazil) is a former professional baseball shortstop. Though he was born in Brazil, Okuda attended Honjo Daiichi High School in Saitama, Japan. He played for the Brazil national baseball team at the 2013 World Baseball Classic.

He was signed by Yasushi Yamamoto and Pat Kelly, scouts for the Seattle Mariners, on December 16, 2009.

On December 18, 2013, Okuda was released by the Mariners.

References

External links

1990 births
2013 World Baseball Classic players
Brazilian expatriate baseball players in Japan
Brazilian expatriate baseball players in the United States
Brazilian expatriate baseball players in Venezuela
Brazilian people of Japanese descent
Living people
People from Marília
Venezuelan Summer League Mariners players
Sportspeople from São Paulo (state)